The 2019–20 Ranji Trophy was the 86th season of the Ranji Trophy, the first-class cricket tournament that took place in India. It was contested by 38 teams, divided into four groups, with ten teams in Group C. The group stage ran from 9 December 2019 to 15 February 2020. The top two teams in Group C progressed to the quarter-finals of the competition.

Despite losing their final match, Jammu & Kashmir finished top of Group C to advance to the quarter-finals. They were joined by Odisha, who drew their final group game. Uttarakhand finished in last place in Group C and were relegated back to the Plate Group for the next season.

Points table

Fixtures

Round 1

Round 2

Round 3

Round 4

Round 5

Round 6

Round 7

Round 8

Round 9

References

Ranji Trophy seasons
Ranji Trophy Group C
Ranji Trophy
Ranji Trophy